This is a list of the Australian moth species of the family Roeslerstammiidae. It also acts as an index to the species articles and forms part of the full List of moths of Australia.

Amphithera hemerina Turner, 1923
Amphithera heteroleuca (Turner, 1900)
Amphithera heteromorpha Meyrick, 1893
Chalcoteuches phlogera Turner, 1927
Harpedonistis gonometra Meyrick, 1893
Hestiaula rhodacris Meyrick, 1893
Macarangela leucochrysa (Meyrick, 1893)
Macarangela pyracma Meyrick, 1893
Macarangela uranarcha Meyrick, 1893
Nematobola candescens Meyrick, 1893
Nematobola isorista Meyrick, 1893
Nematobola orthotricha Meyrick, 1893
Sphenograptis celetica Meyrick, 1913
Thereutis arcana Meyrick, 1893
Thereutis chionozyga Meyrick, 1893
Thereutis conscia Meyrick, 1921
Thereutis insidiosa Meyrick, 1893
Thereutis noxia Meyrick, 1921
Thereutis schismatica Meyrick, 1893
Thereutis tanyceros (Turner, 1939)
Vanicela dentigera Meyrick, 1913
Vanicela tricolona Meyrick, 1913
Vanicela xenadelpha Meyrick, 1889

External links 
Roeslerstammiidae at Australian Faunal Directory

Australia